The Eurovision Young Musicians 2006 was the thirteenth edition of the Eurovision Young Musicians, held at the Rathausplatz in Vienna, Austria on 12 May 2006. Organised by the European Broadcasting Union (EBU) and host broadcaster Österreichischer Rundfunk (ORF), musicians from seven countries participated in the televised final. This was the first time that the competition was held on an open-air stage and was the beginning of the annual Vienna Festival.

A total of eighteen countries took part in the competition therefore a semi-final was held at the Konzerthaus, Vienna on 7 and 8 May 2006. All participants performed a classical piece of their choice accompanied by the Vienna Symphony Orchestra, conducted by Christian Arming. The young musicians could not be older than 19 and their performance during the final could not be longer than 7 minutes and 30 seconds.  and  made their début while  returned.

Andreas Brantelid of Sweden won the contest, with Norway and Russia placing second and third respectively.

Location

Rathausplatz, a square outside the Wiener Rathaus city hall of Vienna, was the host location for the 2006 edition of the Eurovision Young Musicians final. The Konzerthaus, a concert hall in Vienna, Austria, hosted the semi-final round. The Konzerthaus previously hosted the contest in 1998.

Format
Schallbert "Sillety" Gilet was the host of the 2006 contest. The interval act included performances of several Mozart pieces by the host, and other invited artists.

Results

Semi-final
A total of eighteen countries took part in the semi-final round of the 2006 contest, of which seven qualified to the televised grand final.

Part 1 (7 May)

Part 2 (8 May)

Final 
Due to the celebrations of the 250th anniversary of the birth of Wolfgang Amadeus Mozart, the pieces performed by the finalists were restricted to Mozart or pieces from his contemporaries. Awards were given to the top three countries. The table below highlights these using gold, silver, and bronze. The placing results of the remaining participants is unknown and never made public by the European Broadcasting Union.

Jury members 
The jury members consisted of the following:

 – Ranko Markovic (head)
/ – Hiroko Sakagami
 – Martin Fröst
 – Carole Dawn Reinhart
 – Heinz Sichrovsky
 – Erik Niord Larsen
 – Lidia Baich

Broadcasting
The competition was transmitted live over the Eurovision Network by the participating broadcasters.

See also
 Eurovision Song Contest 2006
 Junior Eurovision Song Contest 2006

References

External links 
 Eurovision Young Musicians 2006

Eurovision Young Musicians by year
2006 in music
2006 in Austria
Music festivals in Austria
Events in Vienna
May 2006 events in Europe